Sugamana Sumaigal is a 1992 Indian Tamil-language drama film written and directed by R. Parthiban. The film stars himself and Shali. It was released on 21 February 1992, and failed at the box office.

Plot 

Moorthy, a young man, had to work hard for his big family. An LIC agent falls in love with him. The rest of the story is how he helped his family from the misery.

Cast 

R. Parthiban as Moorthy
Shali
Anu Manickam as Child Heroine (Triplicane)
Radha Ravi as Thangaraj
Vijayakumar as a police officer
Sridevi Vijaykumar as Babu
Renuka as Kalyani
Idichapuli Selvaraj
Typist Gopu
Film News Anandan
Diamond Babu
Kutty Padmini in a guest appearance
Poornam Viswanathan in a guest appearance

Soundtrack 
The soundtrack was composed by Chandrabose, with lyrics written by Pulamaipithan and Vairamuthu.

Reception 
N. Krishnaswamy of The Indian Express wrote, "Sugamaana Sumaigals narrative is a bit disjointed, and director Parthiban isn't able to convey what he wants to with his cinematic style, but then, he picks up the camera and bravely wants to write a story with it". C. R. K. of Kalki played on the film's title and called it "Sogamana Sumaigal" (Sad burdens). According to Parthiban, the "clean" film was rejected by audiences, prompting him to make the more vulgar Ulle Veliye (1994) to compensate for the losses incurred from this film.

References

External links 
 

1990s Tamil-language films
1992 drama films
1992 films
Films directed by R. Parthiban
Films scored by Chandrabose (composer)
Indian drama films